Benzathine benzylpenicillin, also known as benzathine penicillin G, is an antibiotic medication useful for the treatment of a number of bacterial infections. Specifically it is used to treat strep throat, diphtheria, syphilis, and yaws. It is also used to prevent rheumatic fever. It is given by injection into a muscle.

Side effects include allergic reactions including anaphylaxis, and pain at the site of injection. When used to treat syphilis a reaction known as Jarisch-Herxheimer may occur. It is not recommended in those with a history of penicillin allergy or those with syphilis involving the nervous system. Use during pregnancy is generally safe. It is in the penicillin and beta lactam class of medications and works via benzylpenicillin. The benzathine component slowly releases the penicillin making the combination long acting.

Benzathine benzylpenicillin was patented in 1950. It is on the World Health Organization's List of Essential Medicines.

Adverse effects

Mechanism of action
It is in the penicillin class of medications. It is slowly absorbed into the circulation, after intramuscular injection, and hydrolysed to benzylpenicillin in vivo. It is the drug-of-choice when prolonged low concentrations of benzylpenicillin are required and appropriate, allowing prolonged antibiotic action over 2–4 weeks after a single IM dose.

Society and culture
It is marketed by Pfizer (formerly by Wyeth) under the trade name Bicillin L-A.

Compendial status 
 British Pharmacopoeia

References

External links 
 

Benzyl compounds
Combination drugs
Penicillins
Pfizer brands
World Health Organization essential medicines
Wikipedia medicine articles ready to translate